Nebula/Lowrider is a double EP featuring the stoner rock bands Nebula and Lowrider released in 1999.

Track listing

Nebula
All music by Eddie Glass, all lyrics by Nebula.

 "Anything from You" - 3:57
 "Full Throttle" - 4:09
 "Back to the Dawn" - 4:16
 "Fall of Icarus" - 4:12

Lowrider
All music and lyrics by Peder.

 "Lameneshma" - 4:57
 "The Gnome, the Serpent, the Sun" - 5:24
 "Shivaree" - 5:49
 "Upon the Dune [Full Version]" - 5:42

Credits

Nebula
Tracks 1, 2, & 4 Recorded 8–98 at Private Radio, Seattle WA by Jack Endino
Track 3 Recorded 6–98 at LoHo Studios NYC by Joe Hogan
All Music by Eddie Glass
Lyrics by Nebula
1998 Volcanic Pineapple ASCAP
Art by Arik Moonhawk Roper

Lowrider
Andreas Eriksson - Drums, Percussion
Ole Hellquist - Lead Guitars, Vocals (1,2,4)
Niclas Stalfors - Guitars, Vocals (4)
Peder Bergstrand - Basses, Vocals (3,4), Guitars (4), Effects
All Music & Lyrics by Peder
Recorded at KM Studios, Karlskoga, Sweden 5/22/98-5/24/98 (1,3,4) & 8/28/98-8/30/98 (2)
Mastered 8/31/98-9/2/98 at KM Karlskoga
Except "Upon The Dune" (Full Version) by Chuck Lucero at the Santa Fe Center Studios

Critical reception

Reception was generally positive of the combined album. CMJ approved of the combination of Nebula's dynamic tracks that shifted from quiet intros to earth-shaking guitar solos along with Lowrider's simpler groove tracks with their Black Sabbath influences. AllMusic also appreciated the combination, stating that between the two there were "few stylistic surprises, but [...] superb "yields" of crushing power chords and psychedelic, head-nodding grooves."

References

1999 EPs
Nebula (band) EPs
Lowrider (Swedish band) albums
MeteorCity albums
Split EPs